"Beautiful" is a song by American electronica musician Moby. It was released as the fifth single from his seventh studio album Hotel exclusively in mainland Europe on September 12, 2005. Its music video revolves around a swinger party featuring patrons in animal costumes.

The song was later used in the soundtrack of David Frankel's movie The Devil Wears Prada (2006).

Track listing 
 CD single 
 "Beautiful" – 3:10
 "Beautiful"  – 6:43
 "Beautiful"  – 7:03
 "Beautiful"  – 7:11
 "Beautiful"  – 7:14
 12-inch single 
 "Beautiful"  – 7:03
 "Beautiful"  – 7:14
 "Beautiful"  – 6:40
 12-inch single 
 "Beautiful"  – 7:11
 "Beautiful"  – 6:43
 "Beautiful"  – 7:13
 Digital single
 "Beautiful"  – 7:03
 "Beautiful"  – 7:14
 "Beautiful"  – 6:40
 "Beautiful"  – 7:11
 "Beautiful"  – 6:43
 "Beautiful"  – 7:13

Charts

References

External links
 

2005 singles
2005 songs
Moby songs
Songs written by Moby